The American Association for Pediatric Ophthalmology and Strabismus (AAPOS) is an academic association of pediatric ophthalmologists and strabismus surgeons. The pediatric ophthalmology fellowships in the United States are accredited by the AAPOS. International members are also allowed based on evident valuable contributions and dedication to the field of pediatric ophthalmology. The association also publishes the Journal of AAPOS as its official publication.

Past presidents

See also
Pediatric ophthalmology
Infant vision
Orthoptics
International Orthoptic Association

References

External links
American Association for Pediatric Ophthalmology and Strabismus

Ophthalmology organizations
Eye care in the United States